The Beit Medrash Hagadol Synagogue of Jonava, also known as White Synagogue of Jonava,  is a former synagogue in Jonava.

History 

In 1941 80% of Jonava's population was Jewish and town had seven synagogues.

At present only two synagogues remain and both are not in use. Another remaining Jonava Synagogue of Merchants is located closely and used as a shop. The other synagogues were destroyed when Jonava was attacked by Nazi Germany.

Beit Medrash Hagadol Synagogue was one of the two biggest synagogues in Jonava. The main synagogue, also called Red Synagogue of Jonava that was located next to Beit Midrash Hagadol has been destroyed.

Current state 

The current appearance of the synagogue differs significantly from its previous appearance.

In 2015 Beit Medrash Hagadol Synagogue of Jonava was listed in register of cultural values.

See also
Lithuanian Jews

References

Sources
 Lithuanian Jewish community

Synagogues in Jonava
Buildings and structures in Jonava